The list of shipwrecks in May 1838 includes ships sunk, foundered, wrecked, grounded, or otherwise lost during May 1838.

1 May

2 May

3 May

4 May

5 May

6 May

7 May

9 May

10 May

11 May

12 May

13 May

15 May

19 May

20 May

23 May

24 May

27 May

28 May

29 May

30 May

31 May

Unknown date

References

1838-05